Speechify is a mobile and desktop app that reads text aloud using a computer generated text to speech voice.

The app also uses optical character recognition technology to turn physical books or printed text into audio. The app lets users take photos of text and then listen to it read out loud.

Speechify was founded by Cliff Weitzman, a dyslexic college student at Brown University who built the first version of the tool himself to help him keep up with his class readings.

References

External Sources 

 Official Website

Speech synthesis software